This is a list of fictional characters from DC Comics who are or have been enemies of the Justice League. In chronological order (with issue and date of first appearance).

Silver Age

Bronze Age

Modern Age

The New 52

DC Rebirth/DC Universe

DC Infinite Frontier

See also
List of Super Friends villains
List of Batman family enemies
List of Superman enemies
List of Wonder Woman enemies
Rogues
List of Flash enemies
List of Green Lantern enemies
List of Aquaman enemies
List of Martian Manhunter enemies
List of Green Arrow enemies
List of Hawkman enemies
List of Firestorm enemies
List of Blue Beetle enemies
List of Plastic Man enemies
List of Captain Atom enemies
List of Atom enemies
List of Guy Gardner enemies

References

 
Justice League enemies
Justice League enemies